The Centre for Indigenous Theatre is a non-for profit theater educational institution located in Toronto, Ontario. It focuses on performance art from an Indigenous cultural foundation.

History
James H. Buller founded the Centre in 1974 as the Native Theatre School with the Association for Native Development in the Performing and Visual Arts. Buller was a noted opera and musical comedy singer. While earlier in the Canadian Navy before founding the school, Buller competed as a popular boxer known as "Gentleman Jim".  He wanted to see aboriginal actors, playwrights and directors flourish across Canada and create a network of Aboriginal theatre companies.

The School changed its name to the Centre for Indigenous Theatre in 1994. The Centre first offered a one-year program which was expanded to a two-year program. By 1998, the program offered an additional, and optional, third year.

Goal 
"The Centre's goal is to develop and implement educational programs that promote and foster an understanding of Indigenous Theatre while providing the highest caliber arts training to Indigenous students from across Canada."

Funding
All levels of government fund the Centre. The Miziwe Biik Aboriginal Management Board, The McLean Foundation, Molson Companies Donation Fund and the Toronto Blue Jays also provide monetary support to the Centre.

Students
Students must be over the age of eighteen and of Aboriginal descent.

Notable graduates

Gary Farmer – 1974
Graham Greene – 1974
Billy Merasty – 1984
Tina Louise Bomberry – 1988
Jennifer Podemski – 1992
George Leach – 1996
Lucie Idlout – 1997

Faculty
Notable faculty include:

Columpa Bobb
Margo Kane
Jani Lauzon
David Ley
Lee Maracle – cultural director 1998–2000
Muriel Miguel
Daniel David Moses
Drew Hayden Taylor
Paul Thompson
 John Turner (Mump and Smoot)
Tomson Highway
David Calderisi
August Schellenberg

James Buller Awards for Aboriginal Theatre Excellence 
The award, established in 1995, "recognizes the work of Aboriginal people in the arts".

References

External links

First Nations theatre
First Nations education
Drama schools in Canada
Theatre in Toronto
Universities and colleges in Toronto